Prosqualodon is an extinct genus of Early to Middle Miocene cetacean from Argentina, Australia, New Zealand and Venezuela.

Description 
 
Prosqualodon was related to and looked like modern toothed whales. It had long jaws with interlocking teeth that jutted to the outside, remaining visible when the jaws were closed, like those of a gharial.

In the back of the mouth it had triangular teeth similar to those of earlier cetaceans, but in most other respects, it was relatively advanced. It had developed the body form of modern whales, with a short neck and simple jaw structure, and like modern cetaceans, it also had a blowhole. The olfactory apparatus was reduced compared with earlier forms, suggesting that it had already lost much of its sense of smell, presumably relying on sound to catch its prey.

Species 
 Prosqualodon australis Lydekker, 1894 (type); from the early Miocene (Burdigalian) Castillo Formation of Venezuela and the Gaimán and Monte León Formations of Argentina
 Prosqualodon davidis Flynn, 1923; from the early Miocene (Aquitanian) of Tasmania, Australia
 Prosqualodon hamiltoni Benham, 1937; from the late Oligocene (Chattian) of New Zealand; appears to represent distinct genus.

Fossils not assigned to a specific species have also been found in the Calder River Limestone and Jan Juc Formation of Australia.

The nominal species "Prosqualodon" marplesi Dickson, 1964, later treated as a species of the squalodelphinid Notocetus, has been reclassified as a relative of Waipatia and given the new generic name Otekaikea.

References 

Prehistoric toothed whales
Prehistoric cetacean genera
Oligocene cetaceans
Miocene cetaceans
Chattian genus first appearances
Aquitanian genus extinctions
Oligocene mammals of Australia
Miocene mammals of Australia
Fossils of Australia
Miocene mammals of South America
Friasian
Santacrucian
Colhuehuapian
Deseadan
Neogene Argentina
Neogene Venezuela
Fossils of Argentina
Gaiman Formation
Fossils of Venezuela
Fossil taxa described in 1894
Taxa named by Richard Lydekker